The Lehr Infantry Regiment was an infantry regiment of the Imperial German Army in World War I.  It was formed on mobilisation of the German Army in August 1914 and served with the 3rd Guards Division through to the end of the war.

Lehr Infantry Battalion 
The Lehr Infantry Battalion - infantry instruction battalion - was raised in 1819 for the Prussian Army.  In 1914 it was part of the Guards Corps and garrisoned in Potsdam.

Lehr Infantry Regiment

Formation 
With the mobilisation of the German Army on 2 August 1914, the Lehr Infantry Battalion was expanded to regimental strength as the Lehr Infantry Regiment.  It was formed as follows:

The Regiment was also provided with two machine gun companies.

Combat chronicle 
The Lehr Infantry Regiment joined the Guards Fusilier Regiment in the new 6th Guards Infantry Brigade as part of the 3rd Guards Division in the Guards Reserve Corps.  It remained with the 3rd Guards Division throughout the war, even after the Division was triangularized in May 1915.

The Guards Reserve Corps was assigned to the 2nd Army as part of the right wing of the forces that invaded France and Belgium as part of the Schlieffen Plan offensive in August 1914.  It participated in the capture of Namur and was immediately transferred to the Eastern Front to join the 8th Army in time to participate in the First Battle of the Masurian Lakes.  It then fought in the Battle of Łódź. It continued fighting in the Carpathians and Galicia and then participated in the Gorlice-Tarnów Offensive.

The Regiment returned to the Western Front with its Division in April 1916 and entered the trenches in the Champagne region. In July 1916 it fought in the Battle of the Somme. At the beginning of September 1916, the division was again sent to the Eastern Front, returning in November. In 1917 it participated in the Battle of Arras and the Battle of Passchendaele. It then fought against the Allied tank attack in November 1917 in the Battle of Cambrai. In 1918, it fought in the German spring offensive. During the subsequent Allied offensives and counteroffensives, the division faced the French and Americans at Aisne-Marne and in the Meuse-Argonne Offensive. The division was rated as one of the best German divisions by Allied intelligence.

By the end of the war, the Regiment was still with the 3rd Guards Division, XXV Reserve Corps, 3rd Army, Heeresgruppe Deutscher Kronprinz on the Western Front.

Throughout the war, the Regiment lost 103 officers and 5,463 NCOs and men.

See also 

List of Imperial German infantry regiments
German Army order of battle (1914)
German Army order of battle, Western Front (1918)

Notes

References

Bibliography 
 
 
 
 
 

Infantry regiments of the Prussian Army